David William Frank (October 22, 1949 – June 12, 2017) was an American thespian, author, and educator, who taught in Boston, Massachusetts for 34 years at the Roxbury Latin School.

Early life and education 
David Frank was born on October 22, 1949 and raised in Baltimore, Maryland. He attended the Friends School of Baltimore under the tutelage of Gerritt Blauvelt, whose teaching style Frank described as "a slight craziness under a veneer of respectability" that he himself would attempt to emulate many years later as a teacher at Roxbury Latin. Frank went on to attend Harvard University, where he graduated with a degree in English literature, and then to receive a master's degree in Teaching from Stanford University.

Career
Shortly after graduation, Frank commenced a 40-year teaching career in English and theatre, the vast majority of which was spent at Roxbury Latin, the Boston-area high school that is the oldest in continuous existence in North America.

In his 34-year tenure at Roxbury Latin, Frank rose to the position of Director of Dramatics in addition to teaching English. He directed numerous plays, including "The Love of Three Oranges" in a joint production with the Winsor School.

He coached the Roxbury Latin chess team. Meanwhile, Frank continued his acting career in a limited capacity, being particularly fond of Shakespearean roles. He retired in 2012 to focus on his writing, becoming a published author later that year with the release of Monarch Man.

Personal life 
David Frank made his home in West Roxbury, Massachusetts, the neighborhood of Boston where he taught for many years. On June 12, 2017, Frank died of complications from cancer at the age of 67.

Books

 Monarch Man; Bradley Publishing, St. Louis, Missouri, 2012
 The Summertime Stomp; Sarah Book Publishing, Harlingen, Texas, 2015
 Vienna in Violet; Amphorae Publishing Group, Chicago, Illinois, 2015
 Henry and Cleopatra; Create Space Publishing, 2017

References

1949 births
2017 deaths
American educators
American male writers
Deaths from cancer in Massachusetts
Harvard College alumni
Male actors from Baltimore
Male actors from Boston
Stanford Graduate School of Education alumni
People from West Roxbury, Boston